A wink is a facial expression in which one eye is briefly closed. 

Wink, WINK or Winks may also mean:

People

Nickname
 Wink Davenport, American volleyball player, father of tennis player Lindsay Davenport
 Wink Hartman, American businessman
 Don Martindale (born 1963), American football coach
 Wink Martindale (born 1934), US game show host

Surname
 Wink (surname), a list of people named Wink or Winks

Technology
 Apache Wink, a framework for creating and consuming RESTful Web services
 Wink (animated file), an instant messaging feature
 wink pulsing, a signal in telephony
 Wink (platform), a brand of automation products supporting multiple protocols and device makers

Entertainment
 Wink (duo), a female Japanese pop duo
 Wink (South Korean band), a South Korean trot duo
 "Wink" (song), a song by Neal McCoy
 A disc-shaped playing piece in the game tiddlywinks
 "The Wink" (Seinfeld), an episode of the TV show Seinfeld
 Wink (comics), a Korean comics anthology magazine published by Seoul Munhwasa
 Wink (Marvel Comics), a Marvel Comics supervillain
 Recording name of DJ Josh Wink

TV or radio stations
 WINK-TV, the CBS-affiliated television station for Southwest Florida that is licensed to Fort Myers
 WINK-FM, a radio station licensed to Fort Myers, Florida
 WINK, former call letters for WAXA, a defunct radio station formerly licensed to Pine Island Center, Florida
 WFSX (AM), a defunct radio station (1240 AM) formerly licensed to Fort Myers, Florida, United States, which used the call sign WINK from 1944 until 1999 and from 2003 until 2010
 WINQ-FM ("WINK Country 98.7"), a radio station (98.7 FM) licensed to serve Winchester, New Hampshire, United States
 WNNK-FM ("Wink 104"), a radio station serving the Harrisburg, Pennsylvania, area
 WNKI ("Wink 106"), a radio station licensed to Corning, New York

Physiology
 Anal wink, a reflexive contraction of the external anal sphincter
 A reflexive contraction of the vulvar muscles in mares

Other uses
 Wink (soft drink), a grapefruit based soft drink
 Wink, Texas, a city
 Wink High School
 WINKS, an acronym for the market segment "Women with Incomes and No Kids"
 Wink Bingo
 Winks, a chain of convenience stores in Canada owned by Alimentation Couche-Tard

See also
 Winx (disambiguation)

Lists of people by nickname